Association Sportive Fabrègues is a football club located in Fabrègues, France. They play in the sixth tier of French football. The club's colours are red and yellow.

History 
AS Fabrègues was founded in 1935. The first time the club reached the national level was in 2014; they had become champions of the Division d'Honneur in Languedoc-Roussillon in the 2013–14 season. They were subsequently promoted to the Championnat de France Amateur 2, now known as the Championnat National 3. After eight seasons at this level, they were relegated back to the Régional 1 in 2022, finishing bottom of their group.

AS Fabrègues has reached the round of 64 of the Coupe de France on several occasions.

Stadium 
The club is a resident of the Stade Joseph Jeanton in Fabrègues, but can also play at the Stade Robert Carles in the town.

Honours

References

External links 
 Club website
 AS Fabrègues on WorldFootball.net

Association football clubs established in 1935
1935 establishments in France
Sport in Hérault
Football clubs in Occitania (administrative region)